I-370 was an Imperial Japanese Navy Type D1 transport submarine. Completed and commissioned in September 1944, she served in World War II and was converted into a kaiten suicide attack torpedo carrier in January 1945. She was sunk in February 1945 while operating during the Battle of Iwo Jima.

Construction and commissioning

I-370 was laid down on 4 December 1943 by Mitsubishi at Kobe, Japan, with the name Submarine No. 5470. She was launched on 26 May 1944 and renamed I-370 that day. She was completed and commissioned on 4 September 1944.

Service history

Upon commissioning, I-370 was attached to the Sasebo Naval District and was assigned to Submarine Squadron 11 for workups. In January 1945, she was converted from a transport submarine into a kaiten suicide attack torpedo carrier, the conversion involving the removal of her  and Daihatsu-class landing craft and their replacement with fittings allowing her to carry five kaitens on her deck, as well as the installation of Type 22 surface-search radar. On 10 January 1945, she and the submarine  took part in simulated kaiten attacks against towed targets in the Seto Inland Sea that lasted 15 days.

The Battle of Iwo Jima began on 19 February 1945 when U.S. forces landed on Iwo Jima. On 21 February 1945, I-370 got underway from the kaiten base at Hikari and set course for Iwo Jima, where she was expected to begin kaiten attacks on 26 February 1945.

I-370 was on the surface just after dawn on 26 February 1945 preparing to launch all five of her kaitens to attack nine empty American transports steaming from Iwo Jima to Saipan when one of their escorts, the United States Navy destroyer escort , detected her on radar. Finnegan closed the range. Eight minutes after Finnegan detected I-370,  crash-dived and broke radar contact with Finnegan, but at 0659 Finnegan acquired I-370 on sonar. Finnegan launched an unsuccessful Hedgehog attack, followed by a pattern of 13 depth charges set to explode deep. She launched another Hedgehog attack, then dropped a pattern of 13 depth charges set for medium depth at around 10:00. At around 10:05, Finnegan′s crew heard a deep rumbling sound, then observed air bubbles reaching the surface followed by an explosion.

She was both the first submarine of the Chihaya Group and the first transport submarine converted into a kaiten carrier to be lost.

On 6 March 1945, the Japanese ordered I-370 to return to Japan, but she never acknowledged the order. On 14 March 1945, the Imperial Japanese Navy declared I-370 to be presumed lost with all hands off Iwo Jima. She was stricken from the Navy list on 10 April 1945.

Notes

Sources
 Hackett, Bob & Kingsepp, Sander.  IJN Submarine I-370: Tabular Record of Movement.  Retrieved on September 16, 2020.

Type D submarines
Ships built by Mitsubishi Heavy Industries
1944 ships
World War II submarines of Japan
Japanese submarines lost during World War II
Maritime incidents in February 1945
Ships lost with all hands
World War II shipwrecks in the Pacific Ocean
Submarines sunk by United States warships